Dearly Beloved is an album by jazz saxophonist Stanley Turrentine recorded for the Blue Note label and performed by Turrentine with Shirley Scott and Roy Brooks.

Reception
The Allmusic review by Steve Leggett awarded the album 4 stars stating "it remains one of Turrentine's finest Blue Note outings".

Track listing
 "Baia" (Ary Barroso) - 5:32
 "Wee Hour Theme" (Turrentine) - 4:42
 "My Shining Hour" (Arlen, Mercer) - 6:52
 "Troubles of the World" (Traditional) - 5:15
 "Yesterdays" (Otto Harbach, Jerome Kern) - 8:50
 "Dearly Beloved" (Kern, Mercer) - 7:13
 "Nothing Ever Changes My Love for You" (Marvin Fisher, Jack Segal) - 6:20

Personnel
Stanley Turrentine - tenor saxophone
Shirley Scott - organ
Roy Brooks - drums

Production
 Alfred Lion - producer
 Reid Miles - design
 Rudy Van Gelder - engineer
 Francis Wolff - photography

References

Stanley Turrentine albums
Blue Note Records albums
Albums produced by Alfred Lion
1962 albums
Albums recorded at Van Gelder Studio